Backscattering cross section is a property of an object that determines what proportion of incident wave energy is scattered from the object, back in the direction of the incident wave.  It is defined as the area which intercepts an amount of power in the incident beam which, if radiated isotropically, would yield a reflected signal strength at the transmitter of the same magnitude as the actual object produces.

See also 
 Radar cross-section
 Target strength

References 

Radar theory
Radiation